Shawn Terry Cox (born December 26, 1974) is a Barbadian former professional boxer who competed from 2007 to 2015. As an amateur, he competed at the 2000 Summer Olympics and a gold medal at the 2002 Central American and Caribbean Games at light heavyweight. As a professional, he challenged once for the WBA world cruiserweight title in 2012.

Amateur career
1.84/6'0' southpaw Cox competed at the 2000 Summer Olympics in Sydney but ran right into one of the favorites in Frenchman John Dovi and lost 10:14. He also represented Barbados at the Commonwealth Games in 1998, 2002 and 2006 and at the Pan American Games in 1999, 2003 and 2007.

He won the 2002 Caribbean Games defeating Ramiro Reducindo (15:14), benefitting from the absence of Cuban boxers. At the 2006 Central American Games he reached the final where he lost to Cuba's Yusiel Napoles.

Professional career
He turned pro as a cruiser at the advanced age of 32. Showing big power he beat 16 of his first 17 opponents, the loss was on points to an undefeated Italian. Then he even knocked out ex champ Wayne Braithwaite in round 1. After this career best win, however, he fell to his vulnerable chin and age and lost four of his next five bouts within the first three rounds.

Professional boxing record

|-
|align="center" colspan=8|18 Wins (17 knockouts, 1 decision), 6 Losses (5 knockout, 1 decision)
|-
| align="center" style="border-style: none none solid solid; background: #e3e3e3"|Result
| align="center" style="border-style: none none solid solid; background: #e3e3e3"|Record
| align="center" style="border-style: none none solid solid; background: #e3e3e3"|Opponent
| align="center" style="border-style: none none solid solid; background: #e3e3e3"|Type
| align="center" style="border-style: none none solid solid; background: #e3e3e3"|Round
| align="center" style="border-style: none none solid solid; background: #e3e3e3"|Date
| align="center" style="border-style: none none solid solid; background: #e3e3e3"|Location
| align="center" style="border-style: none none solid solid; background: #e3e3e3"|Notes
|-align=center
|Loss
|18-7-0
|align=left| Michał Cieślak
|KO
|1
|26/09/2015
|align=left| Atlas Arena, Łódź
|align=left|
|-
|Loss
|18-6-0
|align=left| Zhang Junlong
|TKO
|2
|29/05/2015
|align=left| Beijing, China
|align=left|
|-
|Win
|18-5-0
|align=left| Santander Silgado
|TKO
|3
|19/12/2014
|align=left| Coliseo Farid Arana Delgadillo, Magangue
|align=left|
|-
|Loss
|17-5-0
|align=left| Oscar Rivas
|TKO
|3
|18/01/2014
|align=left| Bell Centre, Montreal, Quebec
|align=left|
|-
|Loss
|17-4-0
|align=left| Dmitry Kudryashov
|KO
|2
|26/10/2013
|align=left| Express, Rostov-na-Donu
|align=left|
|-
|Loss
|17-3-0
|align=left| Danie Venter
|KO
|1
|21/09/2013
|align=left| Heartfelt Arena, Thaba Tshwane, Pretoria, Gauteng
|align=left|
|-
|Win
|17-2-0
|align=left| Kwesi Jones
|TKO
|4
|24/02/2013
|align=left| Cliff Anderson Sports Hall, Georgetown
|align=left|
|-
|Loss
|16-2-0
|align=left| Denis Lebedev
|KO
|2
|04/04/2012
|align=left| Crocus City Hall, Myakinino
|align=left|
|-
|Win
||16-1-0
|align=left| Wayne Braithwaite
|KO
|1
|25/02/2012
|align=left| Cliff Anderson Sports Hall, Georgetown, Guyana
|align=left|
|-
|Win
|15-1-0
|align=left| Kurt Bess
|TKO
|1
|17/12/2011
|align=left| Cliff Anderson Sports Hall, Georgetown, Guyana
|align=left|
|-
|Win
|14-1-0
|align=left| Francisco Alvarez Ramos
|TKO
|3
|02/04/2011
|align=left| Playa Mamita's, Playa del Carmen, Quintana Roo
|align=left|
|-
|Win
|13-1-0
|align=left| Carlton Shane Bayley
|TKO
|1
|12/02/2011
|align=left| Jean Pierre Sports Complex, Port of Spain
|align=left|
|-
|Win
|12-1-0
|align=left| Anthony Agustin
|TKO
|1
|29/10/2010
|align=left| Cliff Anderson Sports Hall, Georgetown, Guyana
|align=left|
|-
|Win
|11-1-0
|align=left| Leon Gilkes
|UD
|4
|24/09/2010
|align=left| Cliff Anderson Sports Hall, Georgetown, Guyana
|align=left|
|-
|Win
|10-1-0
|align=left| Curtis Murray
|TKO
|2
|24/04/2010
|align=left| Central Indoor Regional Auditorium, Chaguanas
|align=left|
|-
|Loss
|9-1-0
|align=left| Salvatore Erittu
|UD
|12
|11/12/2009
|align=left| Palasport, Porto Torres, Sardinia
|align=left|
|-
|Win
|9-0-0
|align=left| Ricardo Kellman
|TKO
|2
|18/09/2009
|align=left| Copper Sands, Saint Lawrence Gap
|align=left|
|-
|Win
|8-0-0
|align=left| Patrick "The Destroyer" Wilson
|TKO
|2
|22/05/2009
|align=left| George Street Auditorium, Saint Michael, Barbados
|align=left|
|-
|Win
|7-0-0
|align=left| Clyde Williams
|KO
|1
|26/12/2008
|align=left| Jean Pierre Sports Complex, Mucurapo
|align=left|
|-
|Win
|6-0-0
|align=left| Tadius Francis
|KO
|1
|28/11/2008
|align=left| Gaiety Theatre, Rodney Bay
|align=left|
|-
|Win
|5-0-0
|align=left| Ricardo Kellman
|TKO
|1
|01/06/2008
|align=left| Garfield Sobers Gymnasium, Wildey, Barbados
|align=left|
|-
|Win
|4-0-0
|align=left| Leon Gilkes
|TKO
|2
|29/03/2008
|align=left| Dr. João Havelange Centre of Excellence
|align=left|
|-
|Win
|3-0-0
|align=left| Mark Sealy
|TKO
|1
|23/12/2007
|align=left| Garfield Sobers Gymnasium, Wildey, Barbados
|align=left|
|-
|Win
|2-0-0
|align=left| Winston Pompey
|RTD
|2
|30/11/2007
|align=left| Jean Pierre Sports Complex
|align=left|
|-
|Win
|1-0-0
|align=left| Julian Tannis
|TKO
|1
|23/09/2007
|align=left| Tim's On De Hiway, Bridgetown
|align=left|
|}

References

External links
Bio
Caribbean Games 2002
Caribbeans 2006

1974 births
Living people
Light-heavyweight boxers
Barbadian male boxers
Olympic boxers of Barbados
Commonwealth Games competitors for Barbados
Pan American Games competitors for Barbados
Boxers at the 2000 Summer Olympics
Boxers at the 1998 Commonwealth Games
Boxers at the 2002 Commonwealth Games
Boxers at the 2006 Commonwealth Games
Boxers at the 1999 Pan American Games
Boxers at the 2003 Pan American Games
Boxers at the 2007 Pan American Games
Central American and Caribbean Games gold medalists for Barbados
Central American and Caribbean Games silver medalists for Barbados
Central American and Caribbean Games bronze medalists for Barbados
Competitors at the 1998 Central American and Caribbean Games
Competitors at the 2002 Central American and Caribbean Games
Competitors at the 2006 Central American and Caribbean Games
Central American and Caribbean Games medalists in boxing